Joseph Alphonse Bernard (March 27, 1881 – September 7, 1962), which later evolved into the anglicized Joseph Alphonsus, was the 16th and first Acadian Lieutenant Governor of Prince Edward Island, serving between 1945 and 1950.

Born on March 27, 1881 in Tignish, Prince Edward Island, Bernard was the son of Acadians Theodore Bernard and Anne Perry, who was the daughter of Stanislaus Francis Perry. He received his education in Tignish and in various locations on the island.

On September 21, 1909, he married Zoë Chiasson of Tignish and they had seventeen children.  He was a merchant and served as President of the Tignish Merchants Association. He was the Chairman of the Tignish Library and also Civilian Recruiting Director.

A member of the Liberal Party of Prince Edward Island, Bernard was elected on September 15, 1943 to represent the district of 1st Prince in the Provincial Legislature. He was appointed Lieutenant-Governor of Prince Edward Island on May 30, 1945 and served until October 4, 1950.

He died at a nursing home in Sherwood at the age of 81.

His daughter Marcella married Augustin Gallant.

References
 Government of Prince Edward Island biography

1881 births
1962 deaths
People from Tignish, Prince Edward Island
Prince Edward Island Liberal Party MLAs
Lieutenant Governors of Prince Edward Island
Acadian people